Channel 5 (Full Name : Royal Thai Army Radio and Television Station; also known as Thai TV5 or simply TV5) is a Thai free-to-air television network owned by the Royal Thai Army, launched on 25 January 1958.

History 
Launched on 25 January 1958, as HSATV Channel 7 and migrated from broadcasting in black-and-white to a colour television as Channel 5 in 1974. Channel 5 is the second oldest television station in Thailand, owned and operated by the Royal Thai Army, and as such features, among others, programming devoted to the Royal Thai Armed Forces.

Channel 5 completely ceased its analog broadcast on 21 June 2018 at 9:30am as part of its digital switchover.

See also 
 Television in Thailand

References

External links

Television stations in Thailand
Television channels and stations established in 1958
Mass media in Bangkok
Military broadcasting
1958 establishments in Thailand